Maja Murić (born 27 February 1974) is a former professional tennis player from Croatia who is now active with several non-profit organizations.

Tennis career 
During a professional tennis career that spanned 1990–2000, Muric played for both Yugoslavia and Croatia. Together with Nadin Ercegović, Gorana Matić, and Maja Palaveršić she was a member of the original Croatian Fed Cup team in 1992. In 1993, Murić represented Croatia at the 1993 Mediterranean Games, where she claimed two gold medals, including one earned with doubles partner Silvija Talaja.  With doubles partner Ingelise Driehuis, Murić reached the quarterfinals at 1994 Wimbledon Championships.

Murić represented Croatia in women's doubles at the 1996 Summer Olympics, where she and partner Iva Majoli reached the second round before losing to the Spanish team of Arantxa Sánchez Vicario and Conchita Martínez, 6–2, 6–1.

Murić competed in all of women's doubles Grand Slams from 1991–1999.

Non-profit work 

Murić's youth in a war-torn nation, combined with the opportunity for international travel provided by her tennis career, motivated her to become involved in charitable activities. She has spent 15 years working with the Little Star Foundation, a non-profit established by fellow former tennis professional Andrea Jaeger, serving as that organization's Treasurer. In 2006, she co-founded Humanitarian Wave,  501(c)3 non-profit organization focused on helping children and adults living in poverty, suffering from disease, abuse, and neglect.

Murić is now the manager of Galactic Unite, a philanthropic project of Virgin Galactic and Virgin Unite. In that position, she helps develop and manage "programmes that promote education in the areas of science, technology, engineering, and mathematics, as well as entrepreneurship (STEM+)."

ITF Circuit finals

Singles (1–3)

Doubles (8-4)

Best Grand Slam results details

Doubles

External links

References

1974 births
Living people
Yugoslav female tennis players
Croatian female tennis players
Olympic tennis players of Croatia
Tennis players at the 1996 Summer Olympics
Tennis players from Zagreb
Mediterranean Games gold medalists for Croatia
Mediterranean Games medalists in tennis
Competitors at the 1993 Mediterranean Games